White Girl is a 2016 American drama film written and directed by Elizabeth Wood in her directorial debut. It stars Morgan Saylor, Brian Marc, India Menuez, Adrian Martinez, Anthony Ramos, Ralph Rodriguez, Annabelle Dexter-Jones, Chris Noth and Justin Bartha.

The film had its world premiere at the Sundance Film Festival on January 23, 2016. It was released on September 2, 2016, by FilmRise.

Plot
Leah, a student about to enter her second year of college, moves in with her friend Katie into an apartment in Ridgewood, Queens. One night, out of marijuana, she asks a group of young Latinos on her corner to sell her drugs. They refuse. Later she invites Blue into her apartment, who explains that while he is a dealer, he doesn't do hard drugs. They end up having sex on her roof.

Leah tells him he could be making $60 compared to the $20 he has been selling them for. She invites him to a party thrown by her magazine, where she interns, and Blue is able to mark up his prices to the crowd.

Emboldened by his success, Blue asks for a kilo of cocaine from his supplier Lloyd. He agrees and Blue and Leah go to a restaurant for breakfast. While there, he is approached by one of his regulars, who sets him up, and he is immediately arrested by an undercover police officer. Leah picks up the kilo and quietly leaves.

Leah goes to visit Blue in jail and he tells her he may get 20 years in prison due to priors. She decides to help him, telling him that she has the coke, so the police have no evidence. He asks her to return it to Lloyd and explain. As she approaches Lloyd's, she recognizes the same undercover cop right outside, and decides to run. She then finds Blue a lawyer named George, intending to deal the coke to pay his fee. He is optimistic that they have a very good case.

Approaching her boss, Kelly, Leah sells a third of the kilo. Katie and Blue's friends help move the rest, while Blue believes George is representing him pro bono. As her debts pile up, Lloyd finds her, pressuring her for the rest of the money, so she asks Kelly for a $17,000 loan. He instead helps her throw a rave with a cover charge. The party is a success, but Leah takes too many drugs and wakes up alone with no money.

Leah promises George she will get the rest of the money, but he tells her to forget it. He takes her to dinner, explaining that the legal system is unequal and white men who commit violent crimes are more likely to get off for their crimes than non-violent PoC offenders like Blue. The two end up going to Leah's where she passes out, intoxicated. George uses the opportunity to rape her.

Afterwards, Leah becomes silent and withdrawn, staying in bed. She is surprised one day by Blue who arrives in her apartment and crawls into bed with her. He reveals that the lawyer managed to free him and credits Leah with saving his life. Getting on one knee he proposes to her, to which she does not give a clear answer. (However, the next scene they are happily kissing each other.)

Walking down the street together, Leah and Blue are surprised when Lloyd attacks them both, wanting his money. Blue first hits him over the head with a broken bottle then beats him to death with a wrench. As Leah looks on, Blue silently realizes she caused the attack by not returning the coke.

Blue is arrested, watching Leah coldly as he is driven away. Leah is last seen in a classroom, just before the credits.

Cast
 Morgan Saylor as Leah
 Brian Marc as Blue
 Justin Bartha as Kelly
 Chris Noth as George
 India Menuez as Katie
 Adrian Martinez as Lloyd
 Anthony Ramos as Kilo
 Ralph Rodriguez as Nene
 Annabelle Dexter-Jones as Alexa
 Jemel Howard as Darnell

Production
In February 2015, it was revealed that Elizabeth Wood had directed a film from a screenplay she wrote, with Morgan Saylor and India Menuez starring in the film. Gabriel Nussbaum produced the film, while Christine Vachon, Henry Joost and Ariel Schulman produced the film under their Killer Films and Supermarche banners respectively. Wood began writing the feature before attending Columbia University's screenwriting MFA program. She loosely based the film on her own life.

Release
The film had its world premiere at the 2016 Sundance Film Festival on January 23, 2016. Shortly after, Netflix acquired worldwide video on demand distribution rights to the film for a seven figure price. In April 2016, FilmRise acquired theatrical distribution rights to the film with a planned late summer-fall 2016 release. The film was released on September 2, 2016. It was released on Netflix on December 2, 2016.

Reception
White Girl received positive reviews from film critics. It holds a 72% approval rating on review aggregator website Rotten Tomatoes, based on 47 reviews, with an average rating of 6.5/10. The site's consensus states: "White Girl isn't an easy watch, but it adroitly walks the line between exploitation and drama - and marks an admirably assured debut for writer-director Elizabeth Wood". On Metacritic, the film holds a rating of 65 out of 100, based on 23 critics, indicating "generally favorable reviews".

Sheila O'Malley for RogerEbert.com opined that the characters are envelope-thin, with the exception of Blue. She also praised the actor's performance but criticized the one given by Morgan Saylor, saying that "it makes for somewhat dreary viewing when the lead character has no apparent personality". O'Malley gave the film two stars. Vogue mentioned that "It won’t be news to anyone that young, middle-class white girls enjoy countless privileges unavailable to poor Puerto Rican boys, nor that middle-aged, well-educated white men—like Kelly, like Blue’s lawyer—are the most privileged of all. But to see it dramatized, and in such raw, unremittingly cynical, outrageously graphic detail, is still a disturbing shock to the system."

The Hollywood Reporter called it "squalid, shocking and sexy as hell," while Vice called the film "the most explosive portrait of NYC youth since Kids." Peter Dubruge of Variety  gave the film a scandalized negative review, writing: "As much as White Girl has to offer in raw immediacy, it lacks the distance to offer much in the way of meaningful commentary."

References

External links
 
 
 
 
 

2016 drama films
2016 independent films
2016 films
American drama films
American independent films
Films about cocaine
Films set in Queens, New York
Films shot in New York City
Killer Films films
2016 directorial debut films
2010s English-language films
2010s American films